Bulletproof is a 1988 American action film directed by Steve Carver and starring Gary Busey.

Plot
A clan of terrorists, of all backgrounds and types, seize the "Thunderblast" top-secret super tank, hiding it in Mexico. The task of recovering it is entrusted to "Bulletproof" Frank McBain, a former secret agent and current cop.

Cast

Production 
In an interview from 2020 Steve Carver says the production was plagued by shutdowns because production company CineTel had financial problems.

Home Media
Platinum Disc released the film onto DVD in 2002. Then on November 12, 2013, Shout! Factory released the film on DVD with 3 other films. The DVD set is called the "Action-Packed 4 Movie Marathon, Volume 2".

References

External links

1988 films
American action films
Cold War films
Fiction about tanks
CineTel Films films
1988 action films
Films about terrorism
Films directed by Steve Carver
1980s English-language films
1980s American films